Hai (shark) was an advanced model of the Marder-class midget submarines created in Nazi Germany during World War II and operated by the K-Verband. Its prototype performed poorly during test runs and therefore no other boats were produced.

In addition, the Hai could remain under water for up to two hours.

References

Bibliography

External links

Midget submarines
World War II submarines of Germany